Laverda Jota is a Laverda 1000cc Italian motorcycle suggested by the importers Slater Bros. of Collington, near Bromyard, Herefordshire, England. Based on the existing 1973-1981 Laverda 3C model that made 85 hp @ 7,250rpm and reaching speeds of more than 130 mph, the new Jota made a big impression in 1976. 

The Laverda Jota model ran from 1976 through to 1982. The Jota is powered by a 981cc DOHC air cooled inline triple and had a dry weight of 234 kg (515 lb). Originally fitted with a crankshaft with 180° crankpin phasing and ignition timing on the right hand side of the engine till 1980. Then in 1981 the ignition timing which was by then electronic, was moved to the left side and in 1982 the Jota 120° was released which had the crankpin phasing to 120°.

Early Jotas had a 123 then 140 Watt Bosch alternator, which was barely enough to keep pace with discharge with the lights on. The series 2 180° and 120° Jota onwards had 260 watt Nippon Denso alternator.

In Australasia, the UK and South Africa the Jota had high lift camshafts, high compression pistons and less restrictive exhausts. In some European countries (France and Switzerland) Jotas had considerably milder tuning (mild cams -called A12-, flat top low compression pistons, smaller valves and strangled exhausts). It is named after jota a Spanish dance in triple time.

Notes

External links
A review at Classic Motorcycle Mechanics Magazine
Laverdamania website administrated by well known French Laverda enthusiast Jean Louis Olive, author of Legendary Laverda 1949-1989 (ETAI Publications 2006).

 

 
 

Jota
Sport bikes
Motorcycles introduced in 1976